William Lupton (15 June 1884 – 1961) was a British wrestler. He competed in the lightweight event at the 1912 Summer Olympics.

References

External links
 

1884 births
1961 deaths
Olympic wrestlers of Great Britain
Wrestlers at the 1912 Summer Olympics
British male sport wrestlers
People from Elstree